Alexander Hamilton (1755 or 1757–1804) was the first United States Secretary of the Treasury and one of the Founding Fathers of the United States of America.

Alexander Hamilton may also refer to:

People

Government and military 
 Alexander Hamilton (sailor) (before 1688–after 1733), Scottish sea captain, commander of the Bombay Marine
 Alexander Hamilton (of Ballincrieff) (1684–1763), Scottish politician, MP for Linlithgowshire 1727–1741
 Alexander Hamilton (died 1768), Irish MP for Killyleagh
 Alexander Hamilton (died 1809), Irish MP for Ratoath, Carrickfergus and Belfast
 Alexander Hamilton (British Army officer) (1765–1838), British soldier of the Napoleonic Wars
 Alexander Hamilton, 10th Duke of Hamilton (1767–1852), Scottish politician
 Alexander Hamilton Jr. (1786–1875), American colonel and New York City lawyer, son of founding father Alexander Hamilton
 Alexander Hamilton (general) (1815–1907), American Civil War general, grandson of founding father Alexander Hamilton
 Alexander Hamilton (Australian politician) (1816–1869), member of the New South Wales Legislative Assembly
 Alexander Hamilton Jr. (1816–1889), New York City lawyer, Civil War aide-de-camp, grandson of founding father
 Alexander Hamilton, 10th Lord Belhaven and Stenton (1840–1920), Scottish politician

Science and medicine 
 Alexander Hamilton (Maryland doctor) (1712–1756), Scottish-born doctor and writer in colonial Maryland
 Alexander Hamilton (Scottish physician) (1739–1802), co-founder of the Royal Society of Edinburgh
 Alexander Hamilton (linguist) (1762–1824), Sanskrit scholar
 Alexander Greenlaw Hamilton (1852–1941), Australian biologist
 Alexander R. Hamilton (born 1967), British physicist

Sports 
 Alexander Hamilton (footballer, born 1865) (1865–?), Scottish footballer
 Alex Hamilton (footballer, born 1936) (1936–1990), Scottish footballer
 Alex Hamilton (footballer, born 1937) (1937–2009), Scottish footballer
 Alex Hamilton (basketball) (born 1993), American basketball player

Others 
 Alexander Hamilton (priest) (1847–1928), American Episcopalian priest, great-grandson of founding father
 Alexander Hamilton (Virginia lawyer) (1851–1916), lawyer and railroad executive
 Alexander Morgan Hamilton (1903–1970), American philanthropist and civil servant
 Alexander Hamilton (bishop) (1915–2001), Bishop of Jarrow in the Church of England
 Alistair Hamilton (Alexander Macdonald Hamilton, 1925–2012), President of the Law Society of Scotland; vice-Chairman of the Royal Bank of Scotland

Ships
 PS Alexander Hamilton, a steamboat built for the Hudson River Day Line in 1924
 USCGC Alexander Hamilton (WPG-34), a U.S. Coast Guard cutter commissioned in 1937
 USS Alexander Hamilton, a list of ships

Visual arts
 Alexander Hamilton (Ceracchi), a 1794 marble bust by Giuseppe Ceracchi
 Alexander Hamilton (Trumbull), a 1792 painting by John Trumbull
 Statue of Alexander Hamilton (Central Park), an 1880 granite statue by Carl Conrads
 Statue of Alexander Hamilton (Columbia University), a 1908 sculpture by William Ordway Partridge
 Statue of Alexander Hamilton (Washington, D.C.), a 1923 bronze statue by James Earle Fraser

Other uses
 Alexander Hamilton (book), a 2004 book by Ron Chernow
 Alexander Hamilton (film), a 1931 film biography
 "Alexander Hamilton" (song), a song from the 2015 musical Hamilton

See also 
 Alexander Douglas-Hamilton, 16th Duke of Hamilton (born 1978), premier peer of Scotland
 Alexander Hamilton-Gordon (British Army officer, born 1817) (1817–1890), soldier and MP
 Alexander Hamilton-Gordon (British Army officer, born 1859) (1859–1939), soldier, son of the above
 Alexander Hamilton High School (disambiguation)
 Hamilton (musical), a 2015 Broadway musical

Hamilton, Alexander